Shamsul Hossain Sarkar is a Bangladesh Awami League politician and the former Member of Parliament of Rangpur-17.

Career
Sarkar was elected to parliament from Rangpur-17 as an Awami League candidate in 1973.

References

Awami League politicians
Living people
1st Jatiya Sangsad members
People from Rangpur District
Year of birth missing (living people)